"Someday" is a song by Norwegian DJ Kygo and American singer-songwriter Zac Brown, the lead singer from country band Zac Brown Band. It was released by Sony Music from Kygo's third studio album Golden Hour.

Critical reception
Alshaan Kassam of We Rave You felt the song: "blends Kygo’s high-energy production with Band’s soulful vocals to keep us dancing all day long." Sydney Grant of EDM Identity praised Zac Brown "bumping basslines and echoing melodies reminiscent of a beach-side rodeo."

Charts

Weekly charts

Year-end charts

References

2020 songs
Kygo songs
Songs written by Kygo
Songs written by Zac Brown